Gundu Hanumantha Rao (10 October 1956–19 February 2018) was an Indian actor and comedian who worked in Telugu films, theatre, and television. He first appeared in Jandhyala's film Aha Naa Pellanta in 1987 and gained popularity in comedian roles in S. V. Krishna Reddy's films. He is known for his roles in Rajendrudu Gajendrudu, Mayalodu, Yamaleela, Srivariki Premalekha, Pellaniki Premalekha Priyuraliki Subhalekha (1992), Jodi No.1, Nenu Seetamahalakshmi, Kedi No.1, Apparao Driving School, Kalyanam, Original, Neramu Siksha, High School, Kothoka Vintha, Colors, Panchamukhi, Sri Sai Sankalpam, Mano Balam and the TV serial Amrutham. He won three TV Nandi Awards from Andhra Pradesh Government, one of them for Amrutham serial. He was a renowned stage artist before entering into cinema, his first drama being "Ravana Bramha" at the age of 18. He acted in over 600 movies in Telugu and was a popular TV artist.

Gundu Hanumantha Rao was in confectionery business before stepping into the entertainment industry. In 2014, Rao joined Chitti Babu Punyamurthula and Pinki at rallies in support of the Telugu Desam Party. His campaign in the rallies added humor and provided comic relief to the people. He died on 19 February 2018 at 3:30 am in Hyderabad, India, due to sudden cardiac arrest secondary to chronic kidney disease.

Television 
 Amrutham (2001–2007) as Aamudaala Anjaneyalu
 Adhi Thalam
 Aanando Bramha (DD Saptagiri)
 Aalu Baalu (2005) (ETV)
 Aalasyam Amrutham Visham (2005) (MAA TV)
 Sambaraala Rambabu (2007) (MAA TV)
 Yuvaa (2007) (MAA TV)
 Srimathi Sri Subramanyam (2009) (ETV Telugu)
 Saradaaga Kasepu (2017) (ETV Plus)
 Naaticharaami (2017) (Gemini TV)

Filmography

Actor

 Aha Naa Pellanta (1987)
 Satya Puram
 Chinababu (1988)
 Prema (1989)
 Hai Hai Nayaka (1989)
 Kobbari Bondam (1991)
 Babai Hotel  (1992)
 Vaddu Bava Tappu (1993)
 Allari Alludu (1993)
 Prema Chitram Pelli Vichitram (1993)
 Pekata Papa Rao (1993)
 Mayalodu (1993)
 Rajendrudu Gajendrudu (1993)
 Akkum Bakkum (1994)
 Yamaleela (1994)
 Top Hero (1994)
 Criminal (1995)
 Vajram (1995)
 Rikshavodu (1995)
 Ghatothkachudu (1995)
 Bombay Priyudu (1996)
 Maavichiguru (1996)
 Vinodam (1996)
 Oka Chinnamaata
 Sahasa Veerudu Sagara Kanya (1996)
 Amma Donga
 Jai Bajaranga Bali
 Gunshot
 Annamayya (1997)
Super Heros(1997)
 Shrimati Vellosta (1998)
 Sneham Kosam (1999)
 Narasimha Naidu (2001)
 Nuvvu Leka Nenu Lenu (2002)
 Tappu Chesi Pappu Koodu (2002)
 Pellam Oorelithe (2003)
 Jodi No. 1 (2003)
 Nuvvostanante Nenoddantana (2005)
 Balu ABCDEFG (2005)
  Naa Oopiri (2005)
 Bhadra (2005)
 Gowtam SSC (2005)
 Maayajaalam (2006)
 Sri Krishna 2006 (2006)
 Evadaithe Nakenti (2007)
 Aata (2007)
 Shankar Dada Zindabad (2007)
 1940 Lo Oka Gramam (2008)
 Pandurangadu (2008)
 Glamour (2010)
 High School (2010)
 Mynavathi (2010)
 Pappu (2010)
 Prem Rajyam (2010)
 Sandadi (2010)
 Jayammu Nischayammuraa (2011)
 Naaku O Loverundhi (2011)
 Dhoni (2012)
 Idi Mamulu Prema Katha Kadu (2012)
 Mr. 7 (2012)
 Abbo Vaada (2013)
 Colors (2013)
 Kothoka Vintha (2013)
 NRI (2013)
 O Varsham Kurisina Rathri
 Rowdy Gari Pellam (2013)
 Swamy Satyananda (2013)
 Aadu Magaadra Bujji (2013)
 Ila Choodu Okasaari (2014)
 A Shyam Gopal Varma Film (2015)
 Panchamukhi (2015)
 Vadevvadaina Sare Nenu Ready (2015)
 Mano Balam (2016)
 A Aa (2016)
 Sri Sai Sankalpam (2016)
 Babala Bagotham (2018)
 Aaradugula Bullet (2021)

Voice actor

Awards

Nandi TV Awards
 Adhi Thalam
 Amrutham (2007) (Gemini TV)
 Srimathi Sri Subramanyam (2009) (ETV Telugu)

References

External links 
 

1956 births
2018 deaths
Indian male film actors
Telugu male actors
Male actors in Telugu cinema
Indian male comedians
Telugu stand-up comedians
Place of birth missing
Male actors from Vijayawada
20th-century Indian male actors
21st-century Indian male actors
Telugu comedians